KXRS (105.7 FM, "La Mejor 105.7" ) is a radio station broadcasting a Spanish language format. Licensed to Hemet, California, United States, it serves Riverside County, California.  The station is currently owned by Radio Lazer.

External links

Hemet, California
Mass media in Riverside County, California
XRS
XRS